Bradley is an unincorporated community in Jefferson County, in the U.S. state of Ohio.

History
Bradley had its start as a mining community. A post office called Bradley was established in 1904, and remained in operation until 1964. Besides the post office, Bradley had a country store.

References

Unincorporated communities in Jefferson County, Ohio
Unincorporated communities in Ohio